Music Pavilion may refer to the following venues:
PNC Music Pavilion in Charlotte, North Carolina
Music Pavilion (Orion, Illinois), listed on the National Register of Historic Places